José Víctor Sánchez Trujillo (born 3 November 1965) is a Mexican politician affiliated with the National Action Party. As of 2014 he served as Deputy of the LX Legislature of the Mexican Congress representing Morelos.

References

1965 births
Living people
Politicians from Morelos
National Action Party (Mexico) politicians
21st-century Mexican politicians
Deputies of the LX Legislature of Mexico
Members of the Chamber of Deputies (Mexico) for Morelos